Township (Punjabi) is a neighborhood and union council (UC 132, UC 133) located in Iqbal Tehsil, Lahore, Punjab, Pakistan. Township is one of the largest residential neighborhoods in Lahore, which was planned during the President Ayub Khan administration in the 1950s.

Residential subdivisions

Commercial areas
Madina Market - Central commercial area of Township and a major commercial hub for southern Lahore.
Ashiq Market - Situated on College Road.
Mochi Pura
Model Bazar - Situated on C 1 and C II sector
Abu Bakar Road - with a collection of several food vendors and traders of household items.
grocerex - Situated on Abu Bakar Road.

Industrial regions
Quaid-e-Azam Industrial Estate.

References

External links 
Champian Corporation - Fire Safety & Multimedia https://sites.google.com/site/champiancorporation/
Jinnah Islamia College - http://www.jicc.edu.pk/
Maharaja Palace - http://maharajapalace.com.pk/
Pakistan Wushu Federation - PWUF - http://pk.99nearby.com/location/31.452421/74.316223/sector-a2-lahore-pakistan/140
Model Bazar Quaid Township - http://mb.punjab.gov.pk/Modelbazaar/ModelBazaarTownshipLHR.aspx
Quaid-e-Azam Industrial Estate - http://www.qie.com.pk
 Grocerex - http://www.grocerex.pk

Iqbal Town, Lahore